The Astresse was a French automobile manufactured only in 1898.  The company, based in Levallois-Perret, claimed to build some two or three cars a month, using engines built under Grivel license.

See also
Grivel (car)

References
David Burgess Wise, The New Illustrated Encyclopedia of Automobiles.

Vehicles introduced in 1898
1890s cars
Cars introduced in 1898
Veteran vehicles
Defunct motor vehicle manufacturers of France